The canton of Saint-Cyr-sur-Mer is an administrative division of the Var department, southeastern France. It was created in March 2015. Its seat is in Saint-Cyr-sur-Mer.

It consists of the following communes:

Le Beausset
La Cadière-d'Azur
Le Castellet
Nans-les-Pins
Plan-d'Aups-Sainte-Baume
Riboux
Saint-Cyr-sur-Mer
Saint-Zacharie
Signes

References

Cantons of Var (department)